"Watchin' Girls Go By" is a song co-written and recorded by American country music artist Ronnie McDowell.  It was released in November 1981 as the second single from the album Good Time Lovin' Man.  The song reached #4 on the Billboard Hot Country Singles & Tracks chart.  McDowell wrote the song with Buddy Killen.

Chart performance

References

1982 singles
1981 songs
Ronnie McDowell songs
Songs written by Buddy Killen
Song recordings produced by Buddy Killen
Epic Records singles
Songs written by Ronnie McDowell